Behesht Dar Kavir is a village in Ladiz Rural District, in the Mirjaveh of Zahedan County, Sistan and Baluchestan Province, Iran. At the 2006 census, its population was 28, in 4 families.

References 

Populated places in Zahedan County